Bync is an online service that provides deals and coupons by syncing to a user's bank and credit cards to discover the user's favorite stores.  The company was founded in 2012 by Ryan Bales. Bync currently syncs with 10,000 different credit card companies, banks and credit unions across the United States and Canada.

Description
Bync provides its users with personalized deals and coupons by syncing to user's bank and credit cards in order to use purchase history as a way to determine which stores the user shops at the most. Users are sent deal alerts via e-mail when one of their stores has a new deal or coupon.

History
Bync began as the online personal finance website Budgetable, which provided users with money management tools in addition to deals and coupons based on user spending habits.  Development for Bync started in October 2012 when founder Ryan Bales chose to focus the product around spending-based deals. Bync publicly launched on 3 January 2013.

References

External links
 

Internet properties established in 2012
Privately held companies based in Colorado